The 2003 Las Vegas Gladiators season was the 7th season for the franchise.  Before the season started, the Gladiators moved from East Rutherford, New Jersey to Las Vegas, Nevada. They finished at 8–8, 3rd in the Eastern Division and lost in the first round of the playoffs. This was the Gladiators' only playoff appearance in Las Vegas.

Season schedule

Coaching
Frank Haege entered his second season as the head coach of the Gladiators.

Stats

Offense

Quarterback

Running backs

Wide receivers

Touchdowns

Defense

Special teams

Kick return

Kicking

Las Vegas Gladiators
Las Vegas Gladiators seasons
Las